Joshua Zeitlin (1742 in Shklov, Belarus – August 18, 1822, in Kherson, Novorossiya) was a Russian rabbinical scholar and philanthropist. He was a pupil of the Talmudist Rabbi Aryeh Leib ben Asher Gunzberg who was the author of Sha'agat Aryeh; and, being an expert in political economy, he maintained close relations with Prince Potemkin, the favorite of Catherine II. During the Turko-Russian war, Zeitlin furnished the Russian army with various supplies, and managed that business so cleverly that he was afterward appointed imperial court councilor.

On retiring from business in the civil rank of Court Counsellor, Zeitlin resided on his estate Ustzia, where he was occasionally consulted by rabbis with regard to rabbinical questions. He rendered pecuniary assistance to many Talmudists and scholars, and supported a magnificent beit midrash, in which many Jewish scholars were provided with all of life's necessities, so that they could pursue their vocations without worries of any kind. Among the scholars who benefited from his generosity were: Rabbi Nahum, author of Tosafot Bikkurim; Mendel Lepin, author of Cheshbon ha-Nefesh; and the physician Baruch Schick. Zeitlin was the author of annotations to the Sefer Mitzwot Katan, printed with the text (Kopys, 1820), and supplemented by some of his responsa.

References

1742 births
1822 deaths
Belarusian Orthodox rabbis
18th-century rabbis from the Russian Empire
19th-century rabbis from the Russian Empire
Jewish philanthropists